Reda Benchehima (born 15 June 1978) is an Algerian fencer. He competed in the individual and team sabre events at the 2004 Summer Olympics.

References

External links
 

1978 births
Living people
Algerian male sabre fencers
Olympic fencers of Algeria
Fencers at the 2004 Summer Olympics
21st-century Algerian people